The 1966 Troy State Red Wave football team represented Troy State College (now known as Troy University) as a member of the Alabama Collegiate Conference (ACC) during the 1966 NAIA football season. Led by first-year head coach Billy Atkins, the Red Wave compiled an overall record of 5–5 with a mark of 1–2 in conference play.

Schedule

References

Troy State
Troy Trojans football seasons
Troy State Red Wave football